The Turkish Republic of Northern Cyprus takes place in a framework of a semi-presidential representative democratic republic. 

The president is head of state and the prime minister head of government, and of a multi-party system. Executive power is exercised by the government. Legislative power is vested in both the government and the Assembly of the Republic. The judiciary is independent of the executive and the legislature. The prime minister must control a majority of parliament in order to govern.

There have been ten prime ministers of Northern Cyprus since 1983. The premiership's precursor was a post known as the "president of the Turkish Cypriot Communal Chamber". The only man to occupy this post was Rauf Denktaş from 29 December 1969 to 5 July 1976. There were three prime ministers before the Turkish Cypriot community's unilateral declaration of independence in 1983.

The incumbent prime minister, Ünal Üstel, took the oath on 12 May 2022.

See also
Assembly of the Republic (Northern Cyprus)
List of prime ministers of Northern Cyprus
Deputy Prime Minister of Northern Cyprus

References

 Prime Ministers of Northern Cyprus
Politics of Northern Cyprus